Nebitçi Football Team is a Turkmen professional football club based in Balkanabat. They compete in top division of Turkmen football, the Ýokary Liga. Their home stadium is Balkanabat Stadium which can hold 10,000 people.

History
In May 2010, the club changed its name to Balkan Balkanabat from Nebitçi Balkanabat by the decision of Turkmenistan Football Federation.

In 2013, Rahim Kurbanmamedov was appointed head coach. In May 2013 the players Balkan FK came in the final of the AFC President's Cup 2013, scoring three wins in the qualifying tournament in Group "C". Games were held in Phnom Penh, in the first match, Balkan FK beat Hilal Al-Quds (3–2), the second Beoung Ket Rubber (2–0) and third Sri Lanka Army (5–0). In the final stage, that took place in Malaysia, Balkan FK players won Three Star Club (6–0) and Erchim (4–0), thus gaining 6 points reached the final of the 2013 AFC President's Cup. They won the 2013 edition of the AFC President's Cup when they beat KRL of Pakistan in the final 1–0.

From September 2018, it again received the name Nebitchi.

Domestic

Continental

Current squad
.

Managers
 Tachmurad Agamuradov (1991–93)
 Amanmyrat Meredow (2004–08)
 Rejepmyrat Agabaýew (2009)
 Aleksandr Klimenko (2010–11)
 Amanmyrat Meredow (2011–12)
 Ali Gurbani (2012)
 Semih Yuvakuran (2012)
 Rahym Kurbanmämmedow (2013–2014)
 Ali Gurbani (2015)
 Aleksandr Klimenko (2016)
 Hojaahmet Arazow (2018)
 Amanmyrat Meredow (2019–2020)
 Amangylyç Koçumow (2020–present)

Club officials

Management

Current technical staff
Current technical staff of the team are as follows:

Honours

Domestic
Ýokary Liga
Champions (4): 2004, 2010, 2011, 2012
Turkmenistan Cup
Winners (4): 2003, 2004, 2010, 2012
Turkmenistan Super Cup
Winners (3): 2006, 2011, 2012

Continental (Regional)
AFC President's Cup
Winners (1): 2013

References

External links
 Balkan FK Match Centre (archived 2 December 2013)
 Balkan FK in futbol24
 Balkan FK Squad List 2013

Football clubs in Turkmenistan
1960 establishments in Turkmenistan
AFC President's Cup winning clubs